Kotigram is a union council of Lower Dir District in the Khyber Pakhtunkhwa province of Pakistan.

External links

Khyber-Pakhtunkhwa Government website section on Lower Dir
United Nations
Hajjinfo.org Uploads
 PBS paiman.jsi.com

Lower Dir District
Union Councils of Lower Dir District
Union councils of Khyber Pakhtunkhwa